"Mona Lisa" is a song by American rapper Lil Wayne featuring fellow American rapper Kendrick Lamar. It was released on September 28, 2018, as the eighth track off of Wayne's album Tha Carter V.

Background 
Infamous, the producer of the track, began work on it in 2014. He considered leaking the track after a few years, but refrained from the action when he heard Tha Carter V was being released. Former pharma CEO and convicted felon Martin Shkreli shared part of the song in 2017 on streaming app Periscope.

Composition 
The track has the longest duration out of any track on the album, with a length of 5:24.

Lyrics 
On the track, Wayne talks about a woman who sets men up to be robbed by him, while Kendrick talks about a woman he doesn't trust in a relationship. Lil Wayne portrays himself as the robber while Kendrick portrays himself as the boyfriend of the woman, given the name Liz by Lil Wayne.

Critical reception 
The track received critical acclaim. Kevin Goddard of HotNewHipHop called the track a "lyrical onslaught", and said that Wayne and Kendrick had "slick flows & witty metaphors". Israel Daramola of Spin called the track a "fascinating story of deceit and lust".

Commercial performance 
The track debuted at number two behind Maroon 5 and Cardi B's "Girls Like You" on the Billboard Hot 100, making it the highest-charting song from the album.

Charts

Certifications

References 

Lil Wayne songs
Kendrick Lamar songs
2018 songs
Songs written by Lil Wayne
Songs written by Kendrick Lamar
Songs written by Infamous (producer)